Shoshone is a rural, unincorporated community in White Pine County, Nevada.  It is at the south end of State Route 894, off of U.S. Route 93, just west of Great Basin National Park. The community consists of approximately nine ranches situated one to three miles apart in a long valley. The historic mine site of Minerva is located in Shoshone.

References

External links
 

Unincorporated communities in White Pine County, Nevada
Unincorporated communities in Nevada
Great Basin National Heritage Area